SDVK FC is a Djiboutian football club. From 2015 to 2016 it competed in the Djibouti Premier League, the highest level of Djiboutian football.

History

In 2015, SDVK won the 8th edition of the Ramadan football tournament in Djibouti, beating Hayableh District 5–3 in the exhilarating final.

References

Football clubs in Djibouti